Soul Metamorphosis is an EP by Swedish extreme metal band In Battle.

Track listing
 "Pioneers of a Dead Future" - 3:50
 "Dawn of Darkness" - 3:38
 "Soul Metamorphosis" - 3:24
 "King God" - 4:15

Personnel
John Odhinn Sandin - Vocals
John Frölén - Guitars
Nils Fjellström - Drums
Hasse Carlsson - Guitars
Marcus Edvardsson - Bass

References

2003 EPs
In Battle albums